Ianto may refer to:

 Ianto Davies, Welsh international rugby union full back
 Ianto Evans, applied ecologist, landscape architect, inventor, writer, social critic, and teacher
Ianto Morgan, a fictional character in the Penguin Modern Classic "How Green was my Valley" by Richard Llywellyn.
 Ianto Jones, a fictional character in the BBC television series Torchwood

See also
 Ioan
 Siôn